The 1955 Kentucky Wildcats football team was an American football team that represented the University of Kentucky in the Southeastern Conference (SEC) during the 1955 college football season. In their second season under head coach Blanton Collier, the Wildcats compiled a 6–3–1 record (3–3–1 against SEC opponents), tied for seventh in the conference, and outscored opponents by a total of 178 to 131. The team played its home games at Stoll Field in Lexington, Kentucky.

Schedule

References

Kentucky
Kentucky Wildcats football seasons
Kentucky Wildcats football